The Alfred P. Sloan Foundation is an American philanthropic nonprofit organization. It was established in 1934 by Alfred P. Sloan Jr., then-president and chief executive officer of General Motors.

The Sloan Foundation makes grants to support original research and broad-based education related to science, technology, and economics. The foundation is an independent entity and has no formal relationship with General Motors. As of 2022, the Sloan Foundation's assets totaled $2.0 billion.

History
During the initial years of Alfred P. Sloan’s presidency, the foundation devoted its resources almost exclusively to education in economics and business. Grants were made to develop materials to improve high school and college economics teaching; for preparation of and wide distribution of inexpensive pamphlets on the pressing economic and social issues of the day; for weekly radio airing of round table discussions on current topics in economics and related subjects; and for establishing a Tax Institute at the Wharton School of the University of Pennsylvania to interpret new taxes and new trends in public finance for the average citizen.

From 1936 to 1945, Harold S. Sloan, an economist and Alfred's younger brother, served as director and vice president of the foundation.

The Sloan Foundation also made many civic contributions to the foundation's home city of New York, including grants to Lincoln Center for the Performing Arts, Channel 13, New York Public Library, New York University, and the Fund for the City of New York.

Starting January 2018, Adam Falk, past president of Williams College, assumed the presidency of the foundation.

Programs
The Alfred P. Sloan Foundation makes grants in seven broad subjects, known within the foundation as major program areas.

 Science
 Economics
 STEM Higher Education
 Digital Information Technology
 Public Understanding of Science, Technology & Economics
 Working Longer
 Energy & Environment

The Sloan Work and Family Researchers Network supports research and education about work-family issues. The foundation also funded the national workplace flexibility campaign as part of the Working Families program led by Kathleen E. Christensen.

The Sloan Research Fellowships are annual awards given to more than 126 young researchers and university faculty, to further studies in chemistry, computational and evolutionary microbiology, computer science, economics, mathematics, neuroscience, ocean sciences and physics.

In March 2008, the foundation awarded a $3 million grant to the Wikimedia Foundation. It made additional grants in July 2011 and January 2017.

The Sloan Foundation is the primary funder of the Sloan Digital Sky Survey, a major astronomical survey that began data collection in 2000.

In 1945, the Sloan Foundation donated $4 million to launch the Sloan Kettering Cancer Institute, now the Memorial Sloan Kettering Cancer Center.

In 1950, the Sloan Foundation made a gift of more than $5 million to establish a School of Industrial Management, now known as the MIT Sloan School of Management.

Presidents
Alfred P. Sloan Jr. (19341961)
Everett Case (19621968)
Nils Y. Wessell (19691979)
Albert Rees (19791988)
Ralph E. Gomory (19892007)
Paul L. Joskow (20082017)
Adam F. Falk (2018present)

References

External links
 
 Work and Family Researchers Network
 Sloan Foundation Grant records at Williams College Archives & Special Collections

 
Organizations established in 1934
Boston College
Non-profit organizations based in New York City
1934 establishments in New York (state)